Alison Nicholas,  (born 6 March 1962) is an English professional golfer, who won the 1997 U.S. Women's Open.

Amateur career
Nicholas was born in Gibraltar. She was educated at the School of St Mary and St Anne (now Abbots Bromley School for Girls). She enjoyed a very successful amateur career in England. She started playing golf at the age of 17 and won the 1982 and 1983 Northern Girls Amateur Open. Nicholas was the 1983 British Amateur Stroke Play champion. In 1983, Nicholas won the Yorkshire Ladies County Championship.

Professional career
Nicholas turned professional in 1984 and joined the Ladies European Tour in the same year. She joined the LPGA Tour in 1989.

Nicholas won the Women's British Open in 1987, when it was recognised as a major championship by the Ladies European Tour only, and the 1997 U.S. Women's Open. She became the seventh player to have won both the British and U.S. Open titles, joining  Laura Davies, Jane Geddes, Betsy King, Patty Sheehan, Liselotte Neumann and Annika Sörenstam.

At her retirement at the end of the 2004 season, Nicholas had won 12 events on the Ladies European Tour. She topped the European Tour Order of Merit in 1997 and finished in the top-10 15 times in 16 seasons between 1985 and 2000. She also won four times on the LPGA Tour, between 1995 and 1999, including winning the U.S. Women's Open in 1997. In 1992, she won both the Western Australian Open and the Malaysian Open.

She won the 1991 Vivien Saunders Trophy for lowest stroke average (71.71). In 1997, she became the Sunday Times Sportswomen of the Year, was awarded The Association of Golf Writers Trophy and was voted LET Players' Player of the Year, 1997 Evening Mail Sports Personality of the Year and 1997 Midlands Sports Personality of the Year.

In 1998, she was named a Member of the Order of the British Empire in the Queen's Birthday Honours List for "services to women's golf", and in 2002 became a Life Member of the Ladies European Tour.

Nicholas was a member of the European Solheim Cup team in 1990, 1992, 1994, 1996, 1998 and 2000, forming a formidable partnership with Laura Davies. She was non-playing assistant captain in 2005. In 2007, Nicholas was selected captain for the 2009 and 2011 European Solheim Cup teams. In 2011, she led the European team to a 15–13 victory at Killeen Castle outside Dublin, Ireland.

Professional wins (18)

LPGA Tour wins (4)

LPGA Tour playoff record (0–1)

Ladies European Tour wins (12)

Ladies European Tour Tour playoff record (0–1)

Note: Nicholas won the Women's British Open once before it was co-sanctioned by the LPGA Tour in 1994, and recognized as a major championship on the LPGA Tour in 2001.

Source:

Other wins (2)
1992 Western Australian Open, Malaysian Open

Major championships

Wins (1)

Team appearances
Professional
Solheim Cup (representing Europe): 1990, 1992 (winners), 1994, 1996, 1998, 2000 (winners), 2009 (non-playing captain), 2011 (non-playing captain) (winners)
Handa Cup (representing World team): 2008, 2009, 2010, 2011, 2012 (tie), 2013 (winners), 2014

Solheim Cup record

See also
List of golfers with most Ladies European Tour wins

Notes and references

External links

English female golfers
Gibraltarian female golfers
Ladies European Tour golfers
LPGA Tour golfers
Winners of LPGA major golf championships
Solheim Cup competitors for Europe
Members of the Order of the British Empire
The Sunday Times Sportswoman of the Year winners
1962 births
Living people